The 1977 NSWRFL season was the 70th season of Sydney's professional rugby league football competition, the New South Wales Rugby Football League premiership. Twelve clubs, including six of 1908's foundation teams and another six from around Sydney competed for the J. J. Giltinan Shield and WD & HO Wills Cup during the season, which culminated in a grand final between the St. George and Parramatta clubs. NSWRFL teams also competed for the 1977 Amco Cup.

Season summary
During the pre-season Parramatta forward Graham Olling made headlines when he became the first rugby league player to admit to taking anabolic steroids, which at the time were not illegal in the sport.

Another stir was created at the start of the season by Newtown's recruitment of professional American football player, Manfred Moore. The club's first match of the season at Henson Park attracted the likes of Paul Hogan, Jeannie Little and John Laws who witnessed the American score Newtown's first try.

Twenty-two regular season rounds were played from March till August, with Parramatta top of the table for much of the season before finishing the home and away fixtures on top of the table. The final five were rounded out by St. George, Eastern Suburbs, Balmain and Manly. Cronulla-Sutherland had been in contention for a finals spot before fading late in the season.

The 1977 season's Rothmans Medal, as well as Rugby League Week's player of the year award, was awarded to Parramatta centre Mick Cronin.

Teams

Regular season

Bold – Home game
X – Bye
Opponent for round listed above margin

Ladder

Ladder progression

Numbers highlighted in green indicate that the team finished the round inside the top 5.
Numbers highlighted in blue indicates the team finished first on the ladder in that round.
Numbers highlighted in red indicates the team finished last place on the ladder in that round.

Finals

Chart

* - Indicates only the replay match, and not the match ending in a draw.

Grand final

Parramatta boasted an experienced team, making their second consecutive Grand final appearance. The young St. George side dubbed "Bath's Babes", were able to draw on the experience and wiles of their coach Harry Bath, and as the day of the decider approached the betting market narrowed.

A crowd of 66,000 flocked to the Sydney Cricket Ground to see an enthusiastic St. George side come out with all guns blazing. Dragons lock forward “Rocket” Rod Reddy, initially dominated proceedings with his brutal defensive play.

In attack, diminutive Dragons halfback Mark Shulman made inroads and they went ahead 4–0 with two penalty goals to Ted Goodwin. Just before half time, "Lord Ted" scored a miraculous try when he burst through and chipped ahead from halfway. Confronting his opposite fullback Phil Mann, Goodwin kicked again. A foot race followed with cover defenders Graeme Atkins and Ed Sulkowicz joining. The ball trickled towards the dead-ball line but Goodwin got there first, hitting the ground hard and knocking himself out in the process. He had run  and beat every defender to score a breathtaking individual try. John Chapman converted and Goodwin unsteady on the his feet for the rest of the half, had given his side a handy 9–0 lead going into the break.

The second half began like the first, with uncompromising defence. Reddy was targeting Parramatta's champion lock, Ray Price but in the process gave away a number of penalties. Goodwin was felled in an off the ball incident early after the break and took no further part. Mick Cronin slotted three pressure goals to make it 9–6 and the older Eels were well positioned for a comeback against a tiring Dragons defence.

With 10 minutes to run, Parramatta pounced when Cronin drew three defenders and found Price in support who stepped through and gave a final pass to Sulkowicz who scored the equaliser out wide. Now Parramatta had the chance to snatch victory through Mick Cronin’s conversion attempt. A prolific goalkicker throughout his career, Cronin had an opportunity which young players dream of – to kick his team to premiership glory. However, the ball sailed to the right of the uprights and moments later the full-time scoreboard read 9–9. For the first time in history, a New South Wales Rugby Football League Grand final was forced into 20 minutes extra time.

Parramatta took command of the restart and looked strong. The Eels almost scored when prop Graham Olling found space near the line, but he failed to pass to his unmarked front rower partner Ron Hilditch. St. George then lifted a notch, grafted out some territory towards the Eels' end and began to think of field goals. Shulman and Chapman both made unsuccessful attempts before reserve Tony Quirk had a third attempt from close range. Quirk's kick initially looked on target but the ball bounced off the post and into the arms of St. George's hooker, Steve Edge. He grounded the ball over the line but was ruled offside by referee Gary Cook.

With one minute left Cook awarded a penalty to the Dragons within kicking range. In a final twist, Chapman's attempt went the same way as Cronin's earlier kick and after 100 minutes of Grand final play, the scores were still locked at 9–9. The players initially appeared confused, then began shaking hands. The ground announcer advised that a replay would be required.

Greenwood's reference described the match as “the game of the century”. This is a bold claim but it was undoubtedly a brave effort by both sides and a ground-breaking match in Australian rugby league history.

St. George 9 (Tries: Goodwin. Goals: Goodwin 2, Chapman.)

Parramatta 9 (Tries: Sulkowicz. Goals: Cronin

Grand final replay
From the first match, the Dragons had lost halfback Mark Shulman, who suffered a kneeing in the back by Parramatta skipper Ray Higgs, although otherwise their team had come through unscathed. The Parramatta camp had players showing multiple cuts, bruises and bite marks with Ray Price in particular looking like he had been used as a punching bag.

Although a grand final replay had not occurred in the Australian game, the young Dragons were able to draw on the experience of "the Old Fox", Harry Bath who had played in the drawn 1953–54 Challenge Cup Final at Wembley in England, and whose Warrington side won the replay in front of a then record crowd of over 102,000. The 1977 VFL grand final played the same day, also finished as a draw and would need to be replayed.

With a strong breeze at their backs, St George began the match in a determined fashion and were soon in front 7–0 when John Jansen scored following a great forward charge by tireless front rower Bruce Starkey; the final pass, though was at least a metre forward.

Twelve minutes into the second half, St George furthered their lead with a penalty goal to Ted Goodwin. Led by Steve Edge, Craig Young and Robert Stone, with the ruthlessness of Rod Reddy and the experience of veteran Barry Beath, the strong Dragons forward pack laid a good foundation and as the match wore on their backline took advantage. Robert Finch and Graham Quinn began to find room in the centres, and the halves John Bailey and Rod McGregor started to outpace their older opposition. A field goal from Goodwin took the score to 10–0 and then after Parramatta were found offside, Goodwin kicked another penalty goal.

An incident occurred when touch judge Brian Barry was hit by a projectile from the crowd and collapsed. He had to be replaced by a referees' official, Ray O'Donnell, who was wearing normal street attire. For the remainder of the match top referee Jack Danzey acted as touch judge on the eastern side.

Late in the match, Robert Stone found the ball and ran 30 metres to score a rare forward's try right in front of the St. George faithful who, as per the club's tradition, had massed in the Sheridan Stand. With a scoreline of 17–0 the Dragons had the game but then, following a wonderful display of backing up, Saints were awarded a penalty try by referee Gary Cook when John Bailey was taken out by the tired defence. After Goodwin's final conversion and 180 minutes of bone-crushing football, St George were declared the 1977 champions, winning their club's 14th premiership 22–0.

It was a fitting farewell for the stalwart Dragons second rower Barry Beath, the last Dragon to retire who had been involved as a player in their unbeaten eleven-year run of the mid 50s to 60s. Beath is credited with the unusual statistic of winning a premiership in his first season (1966) and his last (1977), but none in ten seasons between.

St. George 22 (Tries: Jansen, Stone, Bailey. Goals: Goodwin 6. Field Goal: Goodwin)

Parramatta 0

Player statistics
The following statistics are as of the conclusion of Round 22.

Top 5 point scorers

Top 5 try scorers

Top 5 goal scorers

References

External links
1977 Tied Rugby League Grand final at eraofthebiff.com
1977 Grand final Replay at eraofthebiff.com
Results:1971-80 at rabbitohs.com.au
1977 J J Giltinan Shield and WD & HO Wills Cup at rleague.com
NSWRFL season 1977 at rugbyleagueproject.org
St. George 1977 season at showroom.com.au
Greenwood, Geoff. Australian Rugby League's Greatest Games.
Rugby League Tables – Season 1977 The World of Rugby League
When an American bled for Newtown – article at leaguehq.com.au

New South Wales Rugby League premiership
NSWRFL season